Karsh may refer to:

People
 Efraim Karsh, historian of the Middle East
 Malak Karsh (1915–2001), Canadian photographer, brother of Yousuf
 Yousuf Karsh (1908–2002), Canadian photographer, brother of Malak
 Karsh Kale, Indian American electronic musician

Fictional characters
 Karsh, a character in the PlayStation video game Chrono Cross
 Karsh, the wraith that was once the former Captain Carthean of Arnor in The Rise of the Witch-king

Other
 Kantele, a Finnic zither, known as the karsh among the Vola-Finnic Mari people
 Karsh, Iran, a village in Razavi Khorasan Province, Iran